Because No One Stopped Us is the debut album from Belvedere, released in 1998.

Track listing 

 "The Bottom Line" – 2:36 
 "Danky" – 1:27
 "Talk Show" – 2:04
 "Bad Day" – 2:13
 "High School Heroics" – 2:18
 "Pass The Joe" – 0:24
 "Market Share" – 2:03
 "Spark" – 
 "Lemmings" – 2:47
 "Subversive" – 2:22
 "Circus" – 2:32
 "My Girlfriend Only Likes Me When She's Drunk" – 0:57
 "Concept" – 2:51
 "High Priced" – 2:11
 "Class A Jackass" – 2:30

1998 debut albums
Belvedere (band) albums